Rick Ball is a Canadian sportscaster who currently works as a hockey play-by-play announcer on Sportsnet's regional Calgary Flames broadcasts as well as Hockey Night In Canada and NHL on Sportsnet.

A British Columbia Institute of Technology graduate, Ball began his radio career in 1993 in his native Kelowna. From 1995 to 2000 he was the play-by-play announcer for the Kelowna Rockets. He then worked for CFAX in Victoria, British Columbia. In 2001 he filled in for Jim Hughson on ten of VTV’s Vancouver Canucks broadcasts. That same year he joined The Team 1040 in Vancouver, where he hosted the noon-to-3 p.m. show. In 2004, The Team acquired the rights to the BC Lions and Ball was named the new play-by-play voice. In 2008, Ball and Joe Kenward were chosen as fill-in voices for lead Canucks announcer John Shorthouse. In 2011, the CBC chose Ball to call Winnipeg Jets games for Hockey Night In Canada. In 2013 he became the main western play-by-play voice for Hockey Night in Canada. In 2014, Ball left Vancouver to become Sportsnet's regional television announcer for the Calgary Flames.

References

British Columbia Institute of Technology alumni
Calgary Flames announcers
Canadian Football League announcers
Living people
National Hockey League broadcasters
People from Kelowna
Vancouver Canucks announcers
Year of birth missing (living people)